The Spanish water polo championship has been contested since 1912. The current league format was introduced in 1965. The top division is currently known as the División de Honor and consists of twelve clubs. The current champions (2021–22 season) are CN Atlètic-Barceloneta from Barcelona.

Competition

Format
The División de Honor season takes place between October and May, with every team playing each other home and away for a total of 22 matches. Points are awarded according to the following:
3 points for a win
1 points for a draw

The team with the highest number of points at the end of 22 rounds of matches become champions.

Promotion and relegation
The bottom team in the standings at the end of the season is relegated to Primera División, while the top team from Primera División is promoted.

List of winners

Spanish Championship (1912–1973)

 1912 Barcelona
 1913 Barcelona (2)
 1914 Barcelona (3)
 1915 Barcelona (4)
 1916 Barcelona (5)
 1917 Barcelona (6)
 1918 Barcelona (7)
 1919 Barcelona (8)
 1920 Barcelona (9)
 1921 Barcelona (10)
 1922–1941: No official competition
 1942 Barcelona (11)
 1943 Barcelona (12)
 1944 Barcelona (13)
 1945 Barcelona (14)
 1946 Barcelona (15)
 1947 Barcelona (16)
 1948 Barcelona (17)
 1949 Barcelona (18)
 1950 Barcelona (19)
 1951 Barcelona (20)
 1952 Barcelona (21)

 1953 Barcelona (22)
 1954 Barcelona (23)
 1955 Barcelona (24)
 1956 Barcelona (25)
 1957 Barcelona (26)
 1958 Barcelona (27)
 1959 Barcelona (28)
 1960 Barcelona (29)
 1961 Barcelona (30)
 1962 Barcelona (31)
 1963 Barcelona (32)
 1964 Barcelona (33)
 1965 Barcelona (34)
 1966 Barcelona (35)
 1967 Barcelona (36)
 1968 Barcelona (37)
 1969 Barcelona (38)
 1970 Barcelona (39)
 1971 Barcelona (40)
 1972 Montjuïc
 1973 Atlètic-Barceloneta

Spanish League (1965–present)

 1965–66 Barcelona
 1966–67 Barcelona (2)
 1967–68 Barcelona (3)
 1968–69 Barcelona (4)
 1969–70 Atlètic-Barceloneta
 1970–71 Barcelona (5)
 1971–72 Barcelona (6)
 1972–73 Atlètic-Barceloneta (2)
 1973–74 Atlètic-Barceloneta (3)
 1974–75 Barcelona (7)
 1975–76 Montjuïc
 1976–77 Montjuïc (2)
 1977–78 Montjuïc (3)
 1978–79 Montjuïc (4)
 1979–80 Barcelona (8)
 1980–81 Barcelona (9)
 1981–82 Barcelona (10)
 1982–83 Barcelona (11)
 1983–84 Montjuïc (5)
 1984–85 Montjuïc (6)
 1985–86 Montjuïc (7)
 1986–87 Barcelona (12)
 1987–88 Catalunya
 1988–89 Catalunya (2)
 1989–90 Catalunya (3)
 1990–91 Barcelona (13)
 1991–92 Catalunya (4)
 1992–93 Catalunya (5)
 1993–94 Catalunya (6)

 1994–95 Barcelona (14)
 1995–96 Barcelona (15)
 1996–97 Barcelona (16)
 1997–98 Catalunya (7)
 1998–99 Real Canoe
 1999–00 Real Canoe (2)
 2000–01 Atlètic-Barceloneta (4)
 2001–02 Barcelona (17)
 2002–03 Atlètic-Barceloneta (5)
 2003–04 Barcelona (18)
 2004–05 Barcelona (19)
 2005–06 Atlètic-Barceloneta (6)
 2006–07 Atlètic-Barceloneta (7)
 2007–08 Atlètic-Barceloneta (8)
 2008–09 Atlètic-Barceloneta (9)
 2009–10 Atlètic-Barceloneta (10)
 2010–11 Atlètic-Barceloneta (11)
 2011–12 Atlètic-Barceloneta (12)
 2012–13 Atlètic-Barceloneta (13)
 2013–14 Atlètic-Barceloneta (14)
 2014–15 Atlètic-Barceloneta (15)
 2015–16 Atlètic-Barceloneta (16)
 2016–17 Atlètic-Barceloneta (17)
 2017–18 Atlètic-Barceloneta (18)
 2018–19 Atlètic-Barceloneta (19)
 2019–20 Atlètic-Barceloneta (20)
 2020–21 Atlètic-Barceloneta (21)
 2021–22 Atlètic-Barceloneta (22)

Performance by club

Spanish Championship

Spanish League

See also
Copa del Rey
Supercopa de España
División de Honor Femenina de Waterpolo

References
General

External links
Official website 

 

  
Water polo competitions in Spain
Water polo
Spain
Sports leagues established in 1912